Urophora tenuis is a species of tephritid or fruit flies in the genus Urophora of the family Tephritidae.

Distribution
China.

References

Urophora
Insects described in 1908
Diptera of Asia